Jun of Gojoseon was the last king of Gija Joseon. He was succeeded by Wiman (Wei Man), whose usurpation of the throne began the dynasty of Wiman Joseon of Gojoseon.

Overthrowing and exile into Mahan 
Wiman entered Gojoseon as a refugee, and submitted to King Jun. Jun granted Wiman's request to serve as a commander of the western borders. However, sometime around 194 BC or 193 BC, Wiman led a revolt, and followed Jun down into Mahan territory, which was situated in the southern part of the Korean Peninsula.

See also 
 List of Korean monarchs
 History of Korea

References

Bibliography 
 
 
 
 
 

Gija Joseon rulers
2nd-century BC rulers in Asia
Monarchs of the Mahan confederacy
2nd-century BC Korean people